Trillium Charter School was a K–12 school located in Portland, Oregon, United States.

In February 2019, Portland Public Schools revoked the school's charter. The school had failed to provide accurate financial statements and had failed to meet an improvement plan to increase academic competence.

Academics
In 2008, 55% of the school's seniors received a high school diploma. Of 20 students, 11 graduated, five dropped out, and four were still in high school the following year. In 2016, 70% of Trillium's students graduated on time out of a class size of 23.

References

Charter schools in Oregon
High schools in Portland, Oregon
Overlook, Portland, Oregon
Portland Public Schools (Oregon)
Public elementary schools in Oregon
Public high schools in Oregon
Public middle schools in Oregon